Reunionia is a genus of flies belonging to the family of the Lesser Dung flies.

Species
R. unica Papp, 1979

References

Sphaeroceridae
Sphaeroceroidea genera
Diptera of Africa